Glycine dehydrogenase is a type of enzyme.

Glycine dehydrogenase may specifically refer to:
Glycine dehydrogenase (cyanide-forming)
Glycine dehydrogenase (cytochrome)
Glycine dehydrogenase (decarboxylating)